The spotted rail (Pardirallus maculatus) is a species of bird in the subfamily Rallinae of the rail, crake, and coot family Rallidae. It is found in Mexico, Central America, the Caribbean, and South America.

Taxonomy

The spotted rail was described by the French polymath Georges-Louis Leclerc, Comte de Buffon in 1781 in his Histoire Naturelle des Oiseaux from a specimen collected in French Guiana. The bird was also illustrated in a hand-colored plate engraved by François-Nicolas Martinet in the Planches Enluminées D'Histoire Naturelle which was produced under the supervision of Edme-Louis Daubenton to accompany Buffon's text.  Neither the plate caption nor Buffon's description included a scientific name but in 1783 the Dutch naturalist Pieter Boddaert coined the binomial name Rallus maculatus in his catalogue of the Planches Enluminées. The spotted rail is now placed in the genus Pardirallus that was erected by the French naturalist Charles Lucien Bonaparte in 1856. The generic name combines the Ancient Greek pardos meaning "leopard" with the genus Rallus. The specific epithet maculatus is Latin for "spotted" or "blotched"

Two subspecies are recognized:

 P. m. insolitus (Bangs & Peck, 1908)
 P. m. maculatus (Boddaert, 1783)

Description

The sexes are alike. They have a long greenish bill with a red spot at the base of the mandible and pinkish legs. Both subspecies have a blackish head with a red eye, black and brown upperparts, and black underparts with white streaks and spots. The nominate subspecies P. m. maculatus has white streaks on its upperparts and P. m. insolitus white spots.

Distribution and habitat

the subspecies P. m. insolitus of the spotted rail is found from Mexico to Costa Rica. The nominate subspecies is found in Cuba, Hispaniola (the Dominican Republic and Haiti), Jamaica, and every mainland South American country except Guyana (though in Chile only as a vagrant to the Juan Fernández Islands). The species also occurs in Panama but the subspecies there is not known. Its distribution in Mexico, Central America, and much of South America is local rather than continuous. In addition to Chile, it has occurred as a vagrant in Trinidad and the U.S. states of Pennsylvania and Texas.

The spotted rail inhabits wet landscapes including marshes, swamps, rice fields, and wet grasslands. It requires dense cover.

Behavior

Movement

The spotted rail has no pattern of movement, though it is known to move locally in response to changing water levels or drought, and has documented vagrancy.

Feeding

The spotted rail forages in shallow water or along the water's edge. It usually stays in cover but at dawn and dusk may feed in more open areas. Its diet includes earthworms, adult and larval insects and other invertebrates, and also small fish and pondweed (Potamogeton epihydrus).

Breeding

The spotted rail's breeding season varies widely across its range. It appears to be territorial during the breeding season. It makes a cup or bowl nest of grass or dead rushes in vegetation near the ground and often above shallow water. The clutch size is two to seven eggs. The incubation period and time to fledging are not known.

Vocalization

The spotted rail makes a "[l]oud, repeated, rasping, groaning screech, usually preceded by grunt or pop, 'g'reech' or 'pum-kreep'" that is thought to be a territorial or aggressive call. It also makes "an accelerating series of deep, gruff, pumping notes" and a "sharp, repeated 'gek'." It sometimes calls at night.

Status

The IUCN has assessed the spotted rail as being of Least Concern. It has a very large range, but an estimated population of only 670 to 6700 mature individuals with an unknown trend. No immediate threats have been identified. It is "[u]ndoubtedly overlooked, especially when breeding, and probably more widespread within [its] range than existing records suggest."

References

External links
Image at ADW

spotted rail
Birds of Central America
Birds of Hispaniola
Birds of the Dominican Republic
Birds of the Yucatán Peninsula
Birds of Venezuela
Birds of Trinidad and Tobago
Birds of Brazil
Birds of Paraguay
Birds of Uruguay
Birds of South America
spotted rail
Birds of the Amazon Basin
Taxonomy articles created by Polbot